Mikhaylovka is a rural locality (a selo) in Gafuriysky Selsoviet, Buzdyaksky District, Bashkortostan, Russia. The population was 296 as of 2010. There are 3 streets.

Geography 
Mikhaylovka is located 13 km southeast of Buzdyak (the district's administrative centre) by road. Novokilimovo is the nearest rural locality.

References 

Rural localities in Buzdyaksky District